Asb-e Shur Pey (also Romanized as Asb-e Shūr Pey and Asb Shūrpey; also known as Asb Shūr’ī) is a village in Karipey Rural District, Lalehabad District, Babol County, Mazandaran Province, Iran. At the 2006 census, its population was 585, in 148 families.

References 

Populated places in Babol County